Hédi Balegh (died 10 November 2022) was a Tunisian academic, writer, journalist, television and radio presenter, and translator.

Balegh was an associate professor of French at the Faculty of Letters, Arts and Humanities at Manouba University. In the 1990s, he published Proverbes tunisiens in three volumes. He was credited with translating The Little Prince by Antoine de Saint-Exupéry into Tunisian Arabic.

Publications
Proverbes tunisiens (Volume 1, 1993)
Proverbes tunisiens (Volume 2, 1994)
Proverbes tunisiens (Volume 3, 1998)
لبيتيت برنسي (The Little Prince, 1997)

References

20th-century births
2022 deaths
Tunisian writers
Tunisian journalists
Tunisian television presenters
Tunisian radio presenters